The following is a list of universities, colleges, junior colleges, and institutes of technology in the Republic of China (Taiwan).

Public universities and colleges

Private universities and colleges

Technical and vocational education

Public

Private

Military and police academies

See also
List of medical schools in Taiwan
List of universities and colleges in Fujian
Lists of universities and colleges
Lists of universities and colleges by country
University alliances in Taiwan

References

Taiwan
Taiwan education-related lists
Taiwan
Lists of organizations based in Taiwan